Biała Góra (Polish for "White Mountain") may refer to these places in Poland:
Biała Góra, Łęczyca County in Łódź Voivodeship (central Poland)
Biała Góra, Poddębice County in Łódź Voivodeship (central Poland)
Biała Góra, Masovian Voivodeship (east-central Poland)
Biała Góra, Pomeranian Voivodeship (north Poland), near where the Nogat splits off from the lower Vistula
Biała Góra, Warmian-Masurian Voivodeship (north Poland)
Biała Góra, West Pomeranian Voivodeship (north-west Poland)
Biała Góra, a hill near Miechów, in Lesser Poland